The Smack Man is the fourth of Nelson DeMille's novels about NYPD Sergeant Joe Ryker. It was first published in 1975 with the protagonist originally as Joe Keller. Then republished in 1989 with the author listed as Jack Cannon. The novel focuses on Joe Ryker's attempt to stop a murderer from poisoning illegal drugs coming into New York City.

References

1975 American novels
Novels by Nelson DeMille
Novels set in New York City